Valery Viktorovich Kechinov (born 5 August 1974) is a Uzbekistani and Russian former international footballer, who spent the majority of his playing career at Spartak Moscow.

Playing career
Kechinov was born in Uzbekistan and started his professional career at local Pakhtakor, with whom he won the Uzbek League title, before moving to Moscow. With Spartak, Kechinov won six Russian Premier League titles and one Cup.

In 2001, after falling out with Oleg Romantsev, Kechinov spent almost entire season on the bench and at the end of the season signed a deal with Saturn Ramenskoe. Kechinov wasn't the only player to have problems with the Spartak management at that time, earlier other star players such as Ilia Tsymbalar, Andrey Tikhonov, Sergey Yuran, Ramiz Mamedov and Evgeniy Bushmanov were forced to leave the team for similar reasons.

After a brief spell at Saturn, Kechinov moved to Shinnik, where he spent the next three years of his career, until retiring in 2004.

Managing career
He worked as Spartak Moscow reserve coach in 2006–2008, assisting Miroslav Romaschenko. In June 2008, Romaschenko left to manage Tom Tomsk, and Kechinov followed him to an assistant manager role. He was fired from Tom along with Romaschenko on 4 September 2008 after a string of bad results.

Career statistics

International goals

Honours

Player
Pakhtakor
 Uzbek League (1): 1992

Spartak
 Russian Premier League (7): 1993, 1994, 1996, 1997, 1998, 1999, 2000
 Russian Cup (1): 1993/1994
 Russian Cup runners-up (1): 1995/1996

Individual
 Uzbekistan Footballer of the Year: 1992
 Uzbek League Top Scorer: 1992 (24 goals)
 The best 33 football players of Russia: 1997

Manager
Spartak
 Russian Reserve Championship winner (2): 2006, 2007

External links

Profile at Krylia Sovetov unofficial website 
Bio at Rusteam 

1974 births
Living people
Sportspeople from Tashkent
Russian footballers
Russia under-21 international footballers
Russia international footballers
FC Spartak Moscow players
Russian Premier League players
FC Saturn Ramenskoye players
FC Shinnik Yaroslavl players
Pakhtakor Tashkent FK players
Uzbekistani footballers
Uzbekistan international footballers
Dual internationalists (football)
Uzbekistani people of Russian descent
Association football midfielders